Hempfield High School is a public senior high school located in Salunga-Landisville, Pennsylvania, United States.  It serves both East and West Hempfield townships and serves as the only high school for Hempfield School District.

Demographics
 Grades: 9-12
 County: Lancaster
 Total students: 2481
 52% male / 48% female
 Teachers: 137

Academics
Hempfield High School continually shows test results above the state average on the PSSA tests  and the SAT. The school has a 95% graduation rate, with almost 82% of Hempfield graduates continuing on to post-secondary education.

In 2005-2006, thirteen students were honored as National Merit Finalists.  Finally, Hempfield students have consistently excelled in the Pennsylvania Math League. In 1999, 2000, 2002, 2003, 2004, and 2005, the Math Team were the first in their region, and in 2001, 2006, and 2008, they were first in the league.

Hempfield offers a number of Advanced Placement courses, including classes in Biology, Calculus, Chemistry, Computer Science, Economics, Environmental Science, English, French, German,  Spanish Literature, Art, Music Theory, Physics, Statistics, US History, and US Government and Politics.  AP exams for college credit are also offered in all of these areas. Honor weighted courses in the Humanities are offered; however, no AP exam accompanies them.

Performing arts and music

Theater
Hempfield High School is renowned for its extensive theater program and its annual Dance Theatre production. Created by Pat Kautter (choreographed and directed by Cody Smith, until 2021 switching to Devon Groff), this is a completely original show which features over 100 students. Dance Theatre celebrated its 25th anniversary in 2008. Hempfield's spring musical productions, under the direction of Alejandro Ramos and Cody Smith, are also known for their excellence. A spring musical is also performed annually.

The 1,300 seat Performing Arts Center was designed by The Ray Group Inc., a Lancaster-based architecture firm that specializes in schools and universities. The PAC opened in the fall of 1995 and was one of the most expensive high school stages in Pennsylvania at the time. It is often rented out by local dance companies and performance groups.

Music
The Hempfield Black Knight Marching Band consists of over 100 members. The Symphonic Band is for grades 10-12. The Concert Band is a 50+ performance group which accepts all levels of musicians from all grades, and is designed for 9th graders to adapt them to the more challenging material and style that is played in this band. The 2012-2013 band was selected to perform at the PMEA All-State conference. The Jazz Band hosts a variety of shows during the year, and the Jazz Lab Band performs with the Jazz Band during the spring jazz concert. All of the bands at Hempfield are supervised by the department chair of music, Matt Ceresini.

Hempfield is also the home to several choral groups: Hempfield Singers, Bel Cantos, Concert Choir, and Chamber Singers. All are under the direction of Alejandro Ramos. Hempfield Singers is a high level choir which is open by audition. Bel Cantos is an all female-choir, also selected through audition. This group is not currently running, however.  Concert Choir is a larger group that is open to any student. The Hempfield Chamber Singers is an elite group which includes a small number of singers. The 2012-2013 group also performed at the state conference. The Chamber Singers perform the national anthem at many of Hempfield's home basketball games.

The Hempfield orchestras include Symphony Strings, an orchestra tailored to advanced musicians; and Concert Strings, a performing orchestra designed for underclassmen.

All orchestras, bands and choirs perform at either the holiday concert, the winter concert or a spring concert. Some groups have shows outside of the Hempfield music department, which change every year.

Athletics

Hempfield competes in the Lancaster-Lebanon League as part of the Pennsylvania Interscholastic Athletic Association, except for:
 Ice hockey, governed by USA Hockey and compete in the Central Pennsylvania Interscholastic Hockey League (CPIHL)
 Rugby, which compete in the Eastern Pennsylvania Rugby Union (EPRU)

Sports
 Baseball
The Hempfield Black Knight Baseball team is currently coached by Jeremy Morrison. Historical highlights and championships:

SECTION ONE:  1983, 1993, 1995, 1996, 1997, 2000, 2001, 2003, 2005, 2012, 2013, 2015, 2016

LANCASTER-LEBANON:  1974, 1996, 1997, 1998, 1999, 2004, 2005, 2008, 2014

DISTRICT 3:  2004, 2015
 Basketball (m/w)
 Bowling
 Cheerleading
 Field hockey
 Football
 Golf
 Ice hockey (not a PIAA sport) 
 Lacrosse (m/w)
 Rugby (m/w; not a PIAA sport) 
 Soccer (m/w)
 Softball
 Swimming and diving
 Tennis (m/w)
 Track and field/cross country
 Volleyball (m/w)
 Wrestling

Basketball
The Hempfield boys' basketball program is led by Coach Danny Walck.  Since taking over in 2010, he has led the Black Knights to a playoff appearance every season.  This includes his first year, 2010-2011, where the Knights won the Lancaster-Lebanon League title.  He is assisted by Dave Brown, Ian Daecher, Mark Macik, and Matt Wagaman.

Football
Led by former Head Coach Ron Zeiber, the Hempfield football program has dramatically increased in performance in recent years. They recently have had two straight berths to the PIAA District 3 AAAA playoffs and advanced to the quarterfinals both times. They lost in double overtime to Cumberland Valley in 2013. They lost in triple overtime to Central Dauphin-East in 2014. They currently play in Section 1 of the L-L League.

Facilities
 Georgelis Law Firm Stadium
 Synthetic turf field used for football, soccer, and lacrosse
 Sponsored by Hempfield HS graduate, resident and attorney, Anthony M. Georgelis.
 Also serves as the home field for Lancaster Inferno minor league soccer team

Notable athletic alumni

 Aaron Herr, son of Tom Herr; member of the Louisville Bats, the Class AAA affiliate of the Cincinnati Reds
 Tom Herr, a former Major League Baseball alumnus of the St. Louis Cardinals, Minnesota Twins, Philadelphia Phillies, San Francisco Giants, and New York Mets; led the Lancaster Barnstormers to the 2006 Atlantic League Championship Series
 John Murray, played goalie for the HHS ice hockey team before moving on to the Ontario Hockey League; signed in 2008 to the nearby Reading Royals of the ECHL; currently plays for the Ontario Reign, an affiliate of the Los Angeles Kings
 Kyle Salyards, competed in the 200 m breaststroke event in the 2000 Olympic Games
 Travis Worra, an American soccer player who has played for D.C. United since 2015.

References

External links
 Official website

Public high schools in Pennsylvania
Education in Lancaster, Pennsylvania
Eastern Pennsylvania Rugby Union
Schools in Lancaster County, Pennsylvania